William Ordway Partridge (April 11, 1861 – May 22, 1930) was an American sculptor, teacher and author. Among his best-known works are the Shakespeare Monument in Chicago, the equestrian statue of General Grant in Brooklyn, the Pietà at St. Patrick's Cathedral in Manhattan, and the Pocahontas statue in Jamestown, Virginia.

Life and career
He was born in Paris, the younger son of George Sidney Partridge, Jr. and Helen Derby Catlin. His father was the Paris representative for the New York City department store A.T. Stewart. His mother was a cousin of the painter George Catlin. His brother, Sidney Catlin Partridge, became a bishop of the Episcopal Church.

Education

Partridge's family returned to New York City in 1868, and enrolled him in Cheshire Academy in Connecticut, followed by Adelphi Academy in Brooklyn. He entered Columbia University in autumn 1881, but had to withdraw because of poor health. He traveled to Europe in 1882, and studied in Florence in the studio of Fortunato Galli, where he became friends with the young Bernard Berenson. Although he never formally enrolled at the Ecole de Beaux-Arts, he audited classes there in autumn 1883, and studied briefly in the Paris studio of sculptor Antonin Mercié. He returned to New York City in Spring 1884, and enrolled in the American Academy of Dramatic Arts. He appeared in a New York City production of David Copperfield, and moved to Boston, where he supported himself by giving dramatic readings of Shakespeare and the Romantic poets. He continued to sculpt, and received encouragement in this from his cousin, the sculptor John Rogers.

In 1887, he married Augusta Merriam, a wealthy widow from Milton, Massachusetts, who was 15 years older. They traveled to Europe that year, where he studied briefly in the Paris studio of painter William-Adolphe Bouguereau. There he formed a close friendship with the neo-Gothic architect Ralph Adams Cram. The couple moved to Rome, where he studied in the studio of Polish sculptor Pio Welonski. They returned to Milton, Massachusetts in 1889, where he established his own studio.

Sculptures

Partridge created two larger-than-life bronze statues of Alexander Hamilton, executed 15 years apart. The first was commissioned by the Hamilton Club of Brooklyn, installed in front of the club's headquarters in Brooklyn Heights, and dedicated on October 4, 1893. For months before and after that dedication, Partridge's full-size plaster model of Hamilton was on exhibition at the World's Columbian Exposition in Chicago. The bronze statue stood in Brooklyn until 1936, when it was relocated to The Grange, Hamilton's country house in northern Manhattan. The second Hamilton statue was commissioned by the Alumni Association of Columbia College [now University]. It was installed on campus in front of Hamilton Hall, and dedicated on May 27, 1908.

In 1890, Partridge won a national competition to create a statue of William Shakespeare for Chicago, Illinois. He returned to Paris, where he set up a studio to work on the project. He exhibited his full-size plaster model of Shakespeare at the 1893 World's Columbian Exposition in Chicago, along with nine other works. His bronze Shakespeare was installed in Lincoln Park the following spring, and dedicated on April 23, 1894, the Bard's 330th  birthday. Partridge wrote a sonnet for its dedication.

The Equestrian Statue of General Ulysses S. Grant (1895-1896) was Partridge's most colossal work. Commissioned by the Union League Club of Brooklyn, it was installed in the center of Bedford Avenue, in front of the Club's headquarters, and dedicated on April 27, 1896.

A bequest from Englishman James Smithson (1765-1829) funded the creation of the Smithsonian Institution. Partridge was commissioned in 1896 to create a bronze memorial tablet commemorating that bequest for Smithson's gravesite in Genoa, Italy. He based his relief portrait of Smithson on an 1817 relief portrait taken from life by Pierre-Joseph Tiolier (formerly attributed to Antonio Canova). Partridge initially made two casts of the bronze tablet, one for the gravesite and the other for the nearby Protestant Chapel of the Holy Spirit. He made a third bronze cast in 1898 for Smithson's alma mater, Pembrook College, University of Oxford. The gravesite's bronze tablet was stolen, and the chapel's bronze tablet was used as a model for a marble copy, that was installed at the gravesite in 1900. Upon learning that the Genoa cemetery was to be destroyed for the expansion of an adjacent quarry, Alexander Graham Bell, a member of the Smithsonian's Board of Regents, proposed that Smithson's remains be brought to the United States. In 1904, Smithson's remains and grave monument were relocated to the Crypt of the Smithsonian's Castle Building in Washington, D.C. The 1900 marble copy of Partridge's tablet was part of that move. The Chapel of the Holy Spirit was destroyed by Allied bombing during World War II. A marble copy of Partridge's tablet was carved in 1963, and stands today at the site of the chapel.

Partridge's most famous religious work is the larger-than-life Pietà he created for St. Patrick's Cathedral, Manhattan. The dead Christ is collapsed before a seated Mary, who cradles his face with her hand. Critic Robert Burns Wilson wrote a sensitive appreciation of the work. Carved from white Carrara marble, Pietà is located in the Ambulatory behind the High Altar.

The Association for the Preservation of Virginia Antiquities commissioned Partridge to create a larger-than-life bronze statue of Pocahontas, the Native American princess, for the 1907 Jamestown Exposition in Norfolk, Virginia. The exposition commemorated the 300th anniversary of the founding of the first permanent English settlement in the Americas. Pocahontus stood in front of the Administration Building for the exposition, and APVA later loaned the statue to the Corcoran Gallery of Art in Washington, D.C. APVA donated the statue to Jamestown, where it was re-dedicated on June 3, 1922. Queen Elizabeth II visited Jamestown in 1957 for the 350th anniversary, and was charmed by the statue. Her reaction inspired a posthumous replica to be cast, which was presented by the Governor of Virginia as a gift to the British people. Dedicated on October 5, 1958, the bronze replica was installed outside St. George's, Gravesend, the English church in which Pocahontas had been interred in 1617.

Teacher
Partridge lectured at the National Social Science Association, the Concord School of Philosophy, and the Brooklyn Institute. From 1897 to 1903, he lectured at what is now George Washington University, in Washington, D.C., and went on to lecture at Stanford University in California.

He wrote a manual on sculpting: Technique of Sculpture (1895).

Partridge's studio was at 15 West 38th Street, Manhattan. Lee Lawrie was among his studio assistants.

Personal
Partridge and Augusta Merriam had a daughter together, also named Augusta (d. 1916). The couple divorced in 1904.

On June 14, 1905 he married the poet Margaret Ridgely Schott. They had a daughter together, also named Margaret.

Partridge died in Manhattan, New York City, on May 22, 1930.

Selected works

Major commissions

 Alexander Hamilton (1892), Hamilton Grange, Manhattan, New York City. Commissioned by the Hamilton Club of Brooklyn, the plaster of this was exhibited at Chicago's 1893 World's Columbian Exposition, and the bronze stood in front of the Club's Brooklyn Heights building from 1893 to 1936. It was then relocated to the grounds of The Grange, Hamilton's country house in Manhattan.
 William Shakespeare Monument (1893), Lincoln Park, Chicago, Illinois
 Equestrian statue of General Ulysses S. Grant (bronze, 1896), Grant Square, Bedford Avenue & Dean Street, Crown Heights, Brooklyn, New York City. Commissioned by the Union Club of Brooklyn, and unveiled April 27, 1896.
 John Reece Monument (bronze, 1896), Forest Hills Cemetery, Boston, Massachusetts
 Adin Ballou Memorial (bronze, 1900), Hopewell, Massachusetts
 Christalan (marble, 1900), Spencer Trask Memorial, Yaddo, Saratoga Springs, New York. "Christalan" was the tile character of Katrina Trask's epic poem about a teenage boy apprenticed to a knight. The author and her husband commissioned the sculpture as a memorial to their four children, who all died young.
 Jordan Font (marble, 1904), Baptistery, National Cathedral, Washington, D.C.
 Pietà (white marble, 1905), Ambulatory, St. Patrick's Cathedral, Manhattan, New York City.
 Pocahontas (bronze, 1906), Jamestown, Virginia
 A posthumous 1958 cast of Pocahontas stands near her gravesite at St. George's Church, Gravesend, England.
 Nathan Hale (bronze, 1907), Nathan Hale Park, Summit & Portland Avenues, St. Paul, Minnesota
 The commission for a Nathan Hale statue at Yale University went to sculptor Bela Pratt.
 Alexander Hamilton (bronze, 1908), Hamilton Hall, Columbia University, Manhattan, New York City
 Joseph Pulitzer Memorial (1913). Woodlawn Cemetery, The Bronx, New York City
 Thomas Jefferson (bronze, 1914), Pulitzer Hall, Columbia University, Manhattan, New York City
 Partridge's plaster model (1901) is at the New York Historical Society, Manhattan.
 Partridge's plaster maquette (1914) is at the Memorial Art Gallery, University of Rochester.
 Horace Greeley Memorial (bronze, 1914), Sawmill Parkway, Chappaqua, New York
 Memory (marble, 1914), Memorial Art Gallery, University of Rochester, Rochester, New York. The sculpture's base features a bas relief bust of James G. Avrell, in whose memory the art gallery was founded.
 Samuel H. Kauffman Memorial (marble & bronze, 1921), Rock Creek Cemetery, Washington, D.C. A bronze figure seated on a granite exedra, with 7 bronze bas-relief panels depicting Shakespeare's Seven Ages of Man.
 Samuel J. Tilden (bronze, 1926), Riverside Drive at 112th Street, Manhattan, New York City
 Paris Gibson (bronze, 1928), Gibson Park, Great Falls, Montana
 Lion Gardiner (bronze, 1930), Fort Saybrook Monument Park, Old Saybrook, Connecticut. Inscription: "In Memory of Lion Gardiner, Builder and Commander of Saybrook Fort, 1635 — 1639." This sculpture was Partridge's last major work.

Portrait busts
 Nearing Home (plaster, 1887), original unlocated. This bust of a 101-year-old woman was Partridge's first popular success.
 Nearing Home (marble, 1892), Smithsonian American Art Museum, Washington, D.C. Exhibited at the 1893 World's Columbian Exposition in Chicago.
 Bust of Benjamin Franklin (bronze, 1891), The Franklin Trust Company, Brooklyn, New York City
 Bust of Reverend Edward Everett Hale (bronze, 1891), Union League Club of Chicago, Illinois Exhibited at the 1893 World's Columbian Exposition in Chicago.
 Replicas at Brooklyn Museum, Cosmos Club (Washington, D.C.), and elsewhere.
 Madonna in Her Maturity (marble, 1892), Dayton Arts Institute, Dayton, Ohio. Exhibited at the 1893 World's Columbian Exposition in Chicago.
 A marble replica is at Brooklyn Museum
 Bust of William Wood (bronze, 1895), Pennsylvania Academy of the Fine Arts, Philadelphia, Pennsylvania
 Head of Peace (marble, 1898), Metropolitan Museum of Art, Manhattan, New York City
 Bust of Alfred, Lord Tennyson (bronze, by 1899), Smithsonian American Art Museum, Washington, D.C.
 Bust of Percy Bysshe Shelly (plaster, 1899), Smithsonian American Art Museum, Washington, D.C.
 Bust of Admiral Robert E. Peary (bronze, 1899), Bowdoin College Museum of Art, Brunswick, Maine
 Bust of George Washington (bronze, 1900), Metropolitan Republican Club, Manhattan, New York City
 A bronze replica is at Sulgrave Manor, Oxfordshire, England, the Washington Family's ancestral home.
 Bust of Captain William Clark (bronze, 1903-1904), William Clark Memorial, Bellefontaine Cemetery, St. Louis, Missouri
 Bust of William Colford Schermerhorn (bronze, 1904), Schermerhorn Hall, Columbia University, Manhattan, New York City
 Bust of Sarah Baker Hester (marble, 1905), Brooklyn Museum, New York City
 Bust of Abraham Lincoln (bronze, 1906), Lincoln Club of New York City
 Bust of Dr. Silas Weir Mitchell (marble, 1910), College of Physicians of Philadelphia, Pennsylvania
 Bronze replicas at Yale University School of Medicine, and Bar Harbor Historical Society, Bar Harbor, Maine.
Bust of Rear Admiral Robert E. Peary (bronze, 1912), Bowdoin College Museum of Art, Brunswick, Maine
 Bust of Chief-Justice Melville W. Fuller (marble, 1914), United States Supreme Court Building, Washington, D.C.
 A bronze replica is in Fuller Park, Chicago, Illinois.
 Bust of John Howard Van Amringe (bronze, 1917-1918), Van Amringe Memorial, Columbia University, Manhattan, New York City
 Bust of Theodore Roosevelt (bronze, 1919), Metropolitan Republican Club, Manhattan, New York City

Bas reliefs
 Midsummer Night's Dream (marble, 1892), Smithsonian American Art Museum, Washington, D.C. Exhibited at the 1893 World's Columbian Exposition in Chicago.
 Head of Garrick Mallery (bronze, 1898), Mallery Monument, Arlington National Cemetery, Arlington, Virginia
 James Smithson Memorial Tablet (bronze, 1896), Smithsonian Institution, Washington, D.C. Created for Smithson's gravesite in Genoa, Italy, the bronze original was stolen, and replaced in 1900 with a marble copy.
 An 1896 bronze replica was given to the Chapel of the Holy Spirit, Genoa, Italy. This was destroyed during World War II, and replaced in 1963 with a marble copy.
 An 1898 bronze replica was given Smithson's alma mater, Pembroke College, University of Oxford, England.
 8 panels from the life of Christ (marble, 1902-1904), Jordan Font, National Cathedral, Washington, D.C.
 Elias Boudinot Memorial Tablet (bronze, 1903), Nassau Hall, Princeton University, New Jersey
 The Last Supper (marble, 1907), Church of the Epiphany (over altar), Washington, D.C.
 Head of Abraham Lincoln (bronze, 1909), Lincoln Memorial, Nay Org Park, Scranton, Pennsylvania
 24 "Hours of the Day" panels (bronze, 1914), Class of 1885 Sundial, College Walk, Columbia University, Manhattan, New York City. The sundial was designed by Charles Follen McKim, of McKim, Mead & White, and featured a 16-ton green granite sphere that cast a shadow on a circular dial. The sphere cracked and was removed in the 1940s. Only the dial's base, encircled by Partridge's decorative panels, survives.
 Mother and Children (bronze, 1915), Charles T. How Memorial, Woodbury Park, Bar Harbor, Maine
 Anne's Tablet (bronze, 1916), Constance Fenimore Woolson Memorial, Mackinac Island State Park, Mackinac Island, Michigan

Other works
 Temporary sculpture: Admiral David Farragut (staff, 1899; demolished 1900), attic figure of Dewey Arch, Madison Square, Manhattan, New York City
 Group: Homer Reciting the Iliad (bronze, 1900), Art Institute of Chicago, Illinois Width: 
 Statuette: General Grant as President (bronze, 1900), Minneapolis Institute of Art, Minnesota Height: 
 Architectural sculpture: Entrance Portal (marble, 1904), Henry W. Poor House, Tuxedo, New York, T. Henry Randall, architect

Writings
Partridge's published writings include articles on aesthetics, books on art history, and a manual on sculpting. He published two volumes of poetry, and three verse novels:
 Poetry: 
 The Song-Life of a Sculptor (1894)
 Sonnets and Lyrics (1902)
 Fiction:
 The Angel of Clay (1900)
  Nathan Hale: The Ideal Patriot (1902)
 The Czar's Gift (1906)
 Non-Fiction:
 Art for America (1894)
 Technique of Sculpture (1895)
 The Works in Sculpture of William Ordway Partridge (1914)
 Articles and lectures:
 "Goethe as a Playwright," in F. B. Sanborn, ed., The Life and Genius of Goethe (Boston: Ticknor and Company, 1886)
 "The True Education and the False," The Arena (magazine), vol. 9, no. 50 (January, 1894), Boston, MA
 "Thomas Ball," The New England Magazine, vol. 12, no. 3 (May 1895)
 "John Rogers, The People's Sculptor," The New England Magazine, vol. 13, no. 6 (February 1896)
 "The Relation of Art to Religion," The Arena (magazine), vol. 17, no. 85 (December 1896), Boston, MA
 "Sculpture in Its Relation to Architecture," lecture given at the 33rd Annual Convention, American Institute of Architects, Philadelphia, November 1900
 "Greek versus Modern Sculpture," Brush and Pencil (magazine),  vol. 16, November 1905,

Affiliations

Architectural League of New York
National Sculpture Society
Sons of the American Revolution
Veteran Corps of Artillery, State of New York
American Institute of Architects (honorary)
Royal Society of Arts, London
He was also a member of the literary and artistic Lotos Club, New York

Notes

References

External links

 

AskArt.com:"William Ordway Partridge"
Smithsonian American Art Museum: "William Ordway Partridge"
(George Eastman House) Sculptures by Ordway, photographed by William Vander Weyde
Smithsonian Archives: W. Ordway Patridge papers

1861 births
1930 deaths
Adelphi University alumni
Columbia College (New York) alumni
People from Milton, Massachusetts
George Washington University faculty
Sons of the American Revolution
20th-century American sculptors
20th-century male artists
19th-century American sculptors
19th-century male artists
American male sculptors